The 2012 Catalunya GP2 Series round was a GP2 Series motor race held at the Circuit de Catalunya in Montmeló, Spain on 12 and 13 May 2012 as the fourth round of the 2012 GP2 Series season. The race was used to support the 2012 Spanish Grand Prix.

After qualifying down in fifth place, the GP2 feature race was won by Giedo van der Garde, with reverse pole man Luiz Razia taking the win at the sprint race.

Classification

Qualifying

Feature race

Sprint race

Standings after the round

Drivers' Championship standings

Teams' Championship standings

 Note: Only the top five positions are included for both sets of standings.

See also 
 2012 Spanish Grand Prix
 2012 Catalunya GP3 Series round

References

Catalunya
Catalunya